1.26 is a public art sculpture commission designed by artist Janet Echelman for Denver's inaugural Biennial of the Americas celebration in July 2010.

Description and history 
The sculpture's name is a reference the 2010 Chile earthquake which may have resulted in a 1.26 microsecond shortening of the days on Earth. The sculpture's shape was inspired by NOAA's graphic simulation of the tsunami caused by the earthquake. The sculpture was hung outside the Denver Art Museum between the museum and the Civic Center Park's Greek Amphitheater. It was installed in Sydney in 2011, Amsterdam in 2012, and Singapore in 2014, and Durham in 2015. From May to October 2016, the work is installed in Quartier des Spectacles in Montreal.

References

External links

1.26 on Janet Echelman's website
Biennial of the Americas Citywide Exhibitions
"Sculpting Urban Airspace: Janet Echelman", September 2011 Sculpture Magazine

2010 Chile earthquake
2010 sculptures
Fabric sculptures
Outdoor sculptures in Denver
Polyesters